María is a municipality of Almería province, in the autonomous community of Andalusia, Spain.

Demographics

References

External links
  María - Sistema de Información Multiterritorial de Andalucía
  María - Diputación Provincial de Almería
  Portal of businesses and Information in Maria - TODOVELEZ.ES

Municipalities in the Province of Almería